Infinitely Polar Bear is a 2014 American comedy-drama film written and directed by Maya Forbes, and starring Mark Ruffalo, Zoe Saldana, Imogene Wolodarsky, and Ashley Aufderheide. The film premiered in competition at the 30th Sundance Film Festival on January 18, 2014. The film was released on June 19, 2015, by Sony Pictures Classics.

Plot 

In the late 1970s, Cameron Stuart is a Bostonian diagnosed with bipolar disorder. He has had a psychotic break, which has caused him to be fired from his job and hospitalized. To be able to afford to take care of their two young children, Cam's wife, Maggie, moves herself, and the children to a small rent-controlled apartment, and struggles to find enough work to support the three of them.

As Cameron is rehabilitated, he moves from a halfway house out on his own. Maggie begins to apply to business schools so the family will eventually become more financially secure, for the sake of the children who are attending a third-rate school in a bad part of town. Maggie manages to obtain a scholarship to attend Columbia University, and she asks Cameron to take care of their daughters while she moves to New York for eighteen months in order to obtain her M.B.A. degree. Cameron reluctantly agrees.

The girls are embarrassed to live with Cameron, who sometimes abandons them in the middle of the night, is aggressively friendly with their neighbors, and starts countless messy projects, making their apartment nearly unlivable. However, his daughters love Cameron deeply and try to help him raise them. 

Cameron takes them to visit his grandmother, a wealthy Boston Brahmin who controls the family trust, and who pays the cost of their rent-controlled apartment. After his grandmother tries to give Cameron her Bentley, he asks her to instead pay for the girls to be privately educated, but she refuses.

Maggie begins to near graduation, which Cameron hopes will enable them to live as a family once more. However, he reveals to Maggie that he has been off his lithium since she left, and Maggie is unable to find a suitable job in Boston. Maggie decides to take a job she has been offered at E. F. Hutton & Co. in New York City, leaving Cameron behind in Boston, and taking the girls with her.

Seeing how unhappy the girls will be, and realizing that her new demanding job will force her to work upwards of twelve hours a day, Maggie decides that, although she will accept the job, she will leave the children in Boston with Cameron, sending money back, so that the girls will be able to attend a good private school. A year later, the girls are enrolled in private school, and Cameron continues to take care of them and watch them proudly.

Cast 
 Mark Ruffalo as Cam Stuart
 Zoe Saldana as Maggie Stuart
 Imogene Wolodarsky (Forbes's 12-year-old daughter) as Amelia Stuart
 Ashley Aufderheide as Faith Stuart
 Keir Dullea as Murray Stuart
 Beth Dixon as Pauline Stuart
 Muriel Gould as Gaga
 Paul Elias as Dick
 Scott Mildenhall as Grizzly

Production 
Amelia Stuart is a fictionalized version of Forbes. Although some people questioned whether Wolodarsky (who had no previous professional acting experience) would be right for the role, Forbes was certain, particularly after seeing her daughter audition with Ruffalo and Saldana.

Forbes told a reporter for USA Today that it was an advantage having her own daughter, Imogene Wolodarsky, play one of the starring roles: "I could make her cry. And I didn't have to worry 'What if I damage this kid forever.' Imogene's part is so demanding because of all the emotional stuff. I would go into a corner with her and I would cry about what the scene was about and tell her why I was crying and what it meant and she'd cry and then we'd go do the scene. She has such a huge heart."

The shooting of the film began on April 9, 2013 in Providence, Rhode Island.

J. J. Abrams and Bryan Burk served as executive producers of the film.

Release 

After premiering at Sundance, the film was acquired by Sony Pictures Classics for major territories in North America and Europe.

The film has played at several film festivals including the Deauville American Film Festival, the Toronto International Film Festival, and the Vancouver International Film Festival. The film was released on June 19, 2015, by Sony Pictures Classics.

Reception 
On review aggregator Rotten Tomatoes, the film holds an approval rating of 81% based on 118 reviews, with an average rating of 6.72/10. The website's critics consensus reads: "Infinitely Polar Bear handles its thorny themes with a somewhat troublesomely light touch, but Mark Ruffalo's complex performance keeps the drama solidly grounded." On Metacritic, the film has a weighted average score of 64 out of 100, based on 32 critics, indicating "generally favorable reviews".

The film also earned Mark Ruffalo a nomination for the Golden Globe Award for Best Actor - Motion Picture Musical or Comedy.

Accolades

Home media
Infinitely Polar Bear was released on DVD & Blu-ray on January 5, 2016.

References

External links 
 Official press kit at MongrelMedia.com
 
 
 Official screenplay

2014 films
Films set in 1978
Films shot in Rhode Island
2014 comedy-drama films
American comedy-drama films
Bad Robot Productions films
2014 independent films
Films set in Boston
Films about bipolar disorder
Films scored by Theodore Shapiro
2014 directorial debut films
Sony Pictures Classics films
Films about parenting
2010s English-language films
2010s American films